Bengate is a hamlet in Norfolk, England, and falls within the civil parish of Worstead.

There is little in Bengate, but it is known for the Weavers' Way footpath trail. The nearest village is Worstead, and is around 3 miles away from North Walsham. The A149 road runs immediately by (but not through) the hamlet, which has been by-passed.

External links

Hamlets in Norfolk
Worstead